HC Vita Hästen is a Swedish hockey club, based in Norrköping, which was founded following the bankruptcy of a previous club called IK Vita Hästen.  The team plays in HockeyAllsvenskan, the second tier of the Swedish ice hockey system, as of the 2014–15 season.

The current team was founded as Norrköping Hockey immediately following the bankruptcy of the previous club. Norrköping Hockey soon merged with Skärblacka IF to form NSH-96, which soon thereafter took the name Hästen Hockey.  Years later, in 2007, the club retook the name "Vita Hästen", but were required by the league to use "HC Vita Hästen" rather than "IK Vita Hästen" to avoid confusion with the first incarnation of "Vita Hästen".
The name "Vita Hästen" literally translates to "[The] White Horse".

The previous club, IK Vita Hästen, was a merger in 1967 of the ice hockey sections of rivaling teams IFK Norrköping and IK Sleipner. The merged club was formally called "IF IFK/IKS" but mostly referred to simply as "Norrköping" in the league tables in newspapers and such. However, since IFK Norrköping played in white jerseys and Sleipner was the name of a horse (Norse god Odin's horse), the team soon got the nickname "vita hästen", i e "the white horse". By 1973, this name was so commonly used that it was chosen as the actual club name.

Season-by-season

External links
Official website
Profile on Eliteprospects.com

References

Ice hockey teams in Sweden
Sport in Norrköping
Ice hockey clubs established in 1996
Ice hockey teams in Östergötland County
HockeyAllsvenskan teams